The 1964 United States presidential election in Kentucky took place on November 3, 1964, as part of the 1964 United States presidential election. Kentucky voters chose 9 representatives, or electors, to the Electoral College, who voted for president and vice president.

Kentucky was won by incumbent President Lyndon B. Johnson (D–Texas), with 64.01% of the popular vote, against Senator Barry Goldwater (R–Arizona), with 35.65% of the popular vote.

This is the solitary occasion since the Civil War when the Unionist strongholds of Whitley County and Knox County voted for a Democratic Presidential candidate. , this is the last election in which the following counties voted for a Democratic Presidential candidate: Kenton, Boone, Campbell, Oldham, Jessamine, Wayne, Estill, Garrard, Green, and Lee. This is also the last time a Democratic presidential candidate won the state by double digits.

Results

Results by county

References 

Kentucky
1964
1964 Kentucky elections